Kenneth Paul Sorensen (November 4, 1934 – July 6, 2012) was an American politician.

Sorensen previously served as a Representative in the House of Representatives of the U.S. state of Florida.  He lived in Key Largo, Florida with his family. Sorenson died on July 6, 2012, at the age of 77.

Education
 B.S. from Quincy University
 M.A. from Florida State University
 Ph.D. from University of Zagreb

References

External links
Official Website of Representative Sorensen

1934 births
2012 deaths
Florida State University alumni
Florida State University faculty
Republican Party members of the Florida House of Representatives
Politicians from Chicago
People from Key Largo, Florida